Major general Sir Christopher Earle Welby-Everard  (9 August 1909 – 10 May 1996) was a senior British Army officer and the last British commander of the Nigerian Army.

Early life
Christopher Welby-Everard was born on 9 August 1909 in Spalding, Lincolnshire, England, the son of Edward Everard Earle Welby-Everard and the great-grandson of Sir Glynne Welby, 3rd Baronet. He was educated at Charterhouse School and graduated from Corpus Christi College, Oxford in 1931.

Military career
On 30 April 1932 he commissioned as a second lieutenant from the General List, Territorial Army into the Lincolnshire Regiment (with seniority backdated to 29 September 1930). Promoted to lieutenant on 29 September 1933, he served in the 2nd Battalion, seeing action in the Arab revolt in Palestine, before working as adjutant at the Regimental Depot in Lincoln between 1937 and 1939, and receiving a promotion to captain on 29 September 1938.

Between 1939 and 1943, during World War II, he worked as a staff officer and attended the Staff College, Camberley. On 11 March 1944 Welby-Everard was promoted to the acting rank of lieutenant colonel and appointed as Commanding Officer (CO) of the 2nd Battalion, Lincolnshire Regiment, which was to participate in the invasion of Normandy. The battalion formed part the 9th Brigade of Major General Tom Rennie's British 3rd Division and took part in the D-Day landings in June. Welby-Everard led the battalion during the early stages of the Normandy Campaign, including in Operation Charnwood, until he was wounded in Operation Goodwood in July. He subsequently served on the staff of the 49th (West Riding) Infantry Division before serving at Middle East Land Forces until September 1948. He was made an Officer of the Order of the British Empire in 1945.

Between 1949 and 1951, Welby-Everard was CO of th3 1st Battalion, Royal Lincolnshire Regiment. From 1952 to 1954 he was Brigade Colonel at HQ Midland Brigade, and was promoted to full colonel on 31 December 1953. Welby-Everard was then made Commander of HQ Scottish Command, holding the position until 1957. Between 1957 and 1959 he was Brigadier General Staff at HQ British Army of the Rhine and then served as Chief of Staff to the Commander-in-Chief, Allied Forces, Northern Europe until October 1961. He was promoted to major-general on 19 May 1959. He was made a Companion of the Order of the Bath in 1960. From 1962 to 1965 Welby-Everard was the General Officer Commanding of the Nigerian Army; the last British officer to hold the role after Nigerian independence. He retired from the army on 1 May 1965, having been made a KBE the same year.

In 1966, he was made a Deputy Lieutenant for Lincolnshire and he served as High Sheriff of Lincolnshire in 1974.

Personal life
Welby-Everard married Sybil Juliet Wake Shorrock in 1938 and together they had two sons. He played minor counties cricket for Lincolnshire from 1934 to 1938.

References

External links
British Army Officers 1939−1945

1909 births
1996 deaths
Academics of the Staff College, Camberley
Alumni of Corpus Christi College, Oxford
British Army major generals
British Army personnel of World War II
British military personnel of the 1936–1939 Arab revolt in Palestine
Companions of the Order of the Bath
Deputy Lieutenants of Lincolnshire
English cricketers
Graduates of the Staff College, Camberley
High Sheriffs of Lincolnshire
Graduates of Joint Services Command and Staff College
Knights Commander of the Order of the British Empire
Lincolnshire cricketers
Nigerian Army officers
People educated at Charterhouse School
People from Spalding, Lincolnshire
Royal Lincolnshire Regiment officers
Military personnel from Lincolnshire